The Pélican was a French warship from the late 17th century. Built in Bayonne, France, the original Pélican was launched in January 1693. A 500-ton ship fitted with 50 guns and commanded by Captain Pierre Le Moyne d'Iberville, she ran aground on the shores of Hudson Bay a few days after a heroic battle in 1697, badly damaged by the encounter and by a fierce storm. In five short months the ship's place in history had been assured, as the victor in the greatest naval battle in the history of New France.

History

Nine Years' War

Upon learning that the English were planning to maintain control of Hudson Bay, French King Louis XIV assembled a fleet of warships, consisting of the Pélican, the Palmier, the Wesp, and the Profond. The goal was to recapture Fort Bourbon, as the French called York Factory, Manitoba, the heart of the fur trade.

Pélican set sail from France on 8 April 1697. On the morning of 5 September 1697 in present-day Canada, temporarily separated from her sister ships, she came face to face with three English ships – the Hampshire, the Dering, and the Hudson Bay – which were carrying supplies to the nearby fort. Although they were outnumbered, the crew of the Pélican engaged in battle and triumphed. The ship, however, was fatally damaged in the battle. With holes below the waterline, Pélican had to be abandoned; it was run aground on 8 September.

The Pélicans victory, later known as Battle of Hudson's Bay,  was certainly due in large part to the leadership of Captain Pierre Le Moyne d'Iberville. In addition to setting an example of courage and valour for his crew, he fought a remarkable strategic battle – with the result that the Hampshire sank, the Dering retreated, and the Hudson Bay was captured complete with its cargo.

Le Pélican (1992) 

Three centuries later, an authentic replica of the Pelican was built in La Malbaie, Quebec. Construction began in 1987, but the project encountered many problems.  In 1991, the architect François Cordeau was removed from the project management. The concept was then changed quite a bit. The wooden hull gave way to steel, up to the waterline. AML Naval Shipyard remade the ship's bottom. All sorts of other important changes reinforced the vessel. The ship was completed in 1992.

For two years, the Pelican II was in the Old Port of Montreal as a museum but it was sold to a Louisiana company in 1995. 

The ship was placed in the port of New Orleans from 1995 to 2002. It was then moved to Donaldsonville, Louisiana, farther up the Mississippi River, where it became the property of the Fort Butler Foundation. It sank once in 2002 and was refloated. It was struck by a tugboat in 2004, and the city decided not to raise the ship. On 19 January 2008, a barge towboat struck Pélican II again.  Fuel leaking from the towboat caused the river to be closed to boat traffic.
 
Half of the hull of the ship was made of metal, so that lifting her out of the water became a problem. Today not much is left of the ship except for a marker.

Photos during construction

References 

Age of Sail frigates of France
Ships built in France
Frigates of the French Navy
Replica ships
New France
1690s ships